FK Vulkan Sport is a football club based in the village of Kosel near Ohrid, North Macedonia. They currently play in the OFS Ohrid league.

References

External links 
Vulkan Facebook 
Club info at MacedonianFootball 
Football Federation of Macedonia 

Football clubs in North Macedonia
FK